Ilavenil Meena Kandasamy (born 1984) is an Indian poet, fiction writer, translator and activist from Chennai, Tamil Nadu, India.

Meena published two collections of poetry, Touch (2006) and Ms. Militancy (2010). From 2001-2002, she edited The Dalit, a bi-monthly alternative English magazine of the Dalit Media Network.

She represented India at the University of Iowa's International Writing Program and was a Charles Wallace India Trust Fellow at the University of Kent, Canterbury, United Kingdom. She writes columns for platforms like Outlook India and The Hindu.

Early life and education
Born in 1984 to Tamil parents, both university professors, she developed an early interest in poetry, and later adopted the name Meena. She completed a Doctorate of Philosophy in Socio-linguistics from Anna University, Chennai. She began writing poetry at age 17  and began translating books by Dalit writers and leaders into English.

Professional career

As a writer, Meena's focus was mainly on caste annihilation, feminism and linguistic identity. She says, "Poetry is not caught up within larger structures that pressure you to adopt a certain set of practices while you present your ideas in the way that academic language is" and thus, prefers to use it for her activism. One of her first collections, Touch was published in August 2006, with a foreword by Kamala Das. Ms. Militancy was published the following year. In this book, she adopts an anti-caste and feminist lens to retell Hindu and Tamil myths. Other works such as Mascara and My lover speaks of Rape won her the first prize in all India Poetry competition.

Touch was criticised for its English language errors, though its challenging themes were described as "interesting". Ms. Militancy was described as an improvement in her use of the English language but "disastrous, if not worse" in terms of themes and content. A review in The Hindu put the negative criticism into context, describing Meena's work as difficult for anyone whose politics were "mainstream". Her poetry is "about the female self and body in ways not 'allowed' by this discourse". An analysis of Touch and Ms Militancy in the Journal of Postcolonial Cultures and Societies concludes that Meena "authors a poetic discourse that not only castigates the prevalent modes of subjugation but also resolutely strives towards futures that are yet to be born." In an interview with Sampsonia Way Magazine, Meena said "My poetry is naked, my poetry is in tears, my poetry screams in anger, my poetry writhes in pain. My poetry smells of blood, my poetry salutes sacrifice. My poetry speaks like my people, my poetry speaks for my people."

Her work has been published in anthologies and journals that include Anthology of Contemporary Indian Poetry, The Little Magazine, Kavya Bharati, Indian Literature, Poetry International Web, Muse India, Quarterly Literary Review, Outlook, Tehelka and The New Indian Express. She was also invited to participate in the International Writing Program at the University of Iowa in 2009 Two years later, Meena was made the Charles Wallace India Trust Fellow at the University of Kent. She was a featured poet at the City of Asylum Jazz Poetry
Concert held in Pittsburgh, the 14th Poetry Africa
International Festival (2010), Durban and the DSC Jaipur
Literature Festival (2011). She co-authored AYYANKALI: A Dalit leader of Organic Protest, a biography of Ayyankali, a dalit leader in Kerala. Meena was shortlisted among 21 short fiction women writers aged less than 40 from South Asia for an anthology published by Zubaan, New Delhi. In 2014, she published a novel about the Kilvenmani massacre titled The Gypsy Goddess, influenced by the figure of Kurathi Amman, her "ancestral goddess". From January 2013, she began working on a book titled Caste and the City of Nine Gates, her first non-fiction work.

As activist 
Meena works closely with issues of caste and gender and how society puts people into stereotypical roles on the basis of these categories. She has faced threats for her fearless criticism of the Hindu society, to which she says, "This threat of violence shouldn’t dictate what you are going to write or hinder you in any manner.”

In 2012, a group of Dalit students of Osmania University, Hyderabad, organised a beef eating festival to protest against the "food fascism" in hostels. The right-wing student group Akhil Bharatiya Vidyarthi Parishad (ABVP) staged protests against the event and organisers. Meena attended the festival and spoke in support of it. She faced incessant abuse online as a result. The Network of Women in Media India (WMNI) released a press statement condemning the attack on her.

As translator
Meena has translated prose and poetry from Tamil. She has translated the work of Periyar E. V. Ramasamy, Thol. Thirumavalavan and Tamil Eelam writers such as Kasi Anandan, Cheran and VIS Jayapalan into English. Speaking about her role as translator, she says "I know that there is no limit, no boundary, no specific style guide to poetry—that you are free to experiment, that you are free to find your own voice, that you are free to flounder and also free to fail once in a while because all this happens all the time when you translate."

As actor
Meena made her acting debut in the Malayalam film, Oraalppokkam. It was the first online crowd funded independent Malayalam feature film.

Awards
 Hermann Kesten Prize (2022) by PEN Centre Germany.

Notable works

Biographies
 (with M. Nisar) AYYANKALI: A Dalit leader of Organic Protest. Foreword by Kancha Ilaiah, Other Books, Calicut, January 2008, pp. 103.

Poetry
 Ms. Militancy, 2010, published by Navayana
“Ms Militancy”, the title poem of this volume, is based on Kannaki, the heroine of the Tamil Classic Silapathikaram. This poem is a call to women to be revolutionary and courageous like the heroine herself.
 TOUCH. Published by Peacock Books, Mumbai in August 2006, .
 (Chapbook) 16 elegant, untitled poems have been hosted as an e-chapbook The Eighth Day of Creation on the poetry website Slow Trains.
 #ThisPoemWillProvokeYou & Other Poems, chapbook, HarperCollins India, 2015.
 We Are Not The Citizens, limited edition handmade chapbook (53 copies), Tangerine Press, London, 2018.

Novels
 The Gypsy Goddess, Atlantic Books, April 2014.
 When I Hit You: Or, A Portrait of the Writer as a Young Wife, Atlantic Books, May 2017. It was shortlisted for Women's Prize 2018.
 Exquisite Cadavers, Atlantic Books, 2019.

Translations
 Talisman: Extreme Emotions of Dalit Liberation, Thol.Thirumaavalavan, Samya (Kolkata) 2003.
 Uproot Hindutva: The Fiery Voice of the Liberation Panthers, Thol. Thirumaavalavan, Samya (Kolkata), 2004.
 Why Were Women Enslaved, Thantai Periyar E.V.Ramasamy, The Periyar Self-Respect Propaganda Institution (Chennai), 2007.
 Waking is Another Dream: Poems on the Genocide in Tamil Eelam, D. Ravikumar (editor), Ravishanker (co-translator) Navayana Publishing (New Delhi), 2010. 
 (editor/translator): Desires Become Demons: Poems of Four Tamil Women Poets: Malathi Maithri, Salma, Kutti Revathi, Sukirtharani, Tilted Axis Press (Sheffield), 2018.
 Thirukkural: The Book of Desire''', a feminist's translation of Book III of the Tirukkural, Penguin Random House India (New Delhi), 2023.

See alsoThe Orders Were to Rape You'', 2021 book by Kandasamy about the Sri Lankan Civil War
Dalit literature

References

External links

Official website

21st-century Indian poets
Indian feminist writers
English-language poets from India
Writers from Chennai
Living people
1984 births
Indian women poets
21st-century Indian women writers
International Writing Program alumni
Women writers from Tamil Nadu
Poets from Tamil Nadu
Dalit women writers
Dalit writers
Actresses in Malayalam cinema